Mavrovo or Mavrova can refer to:

 Mavrovo (region), a region in North Macedonia
 Mavrovo National Park, a national park in North Macedonia
 Mavrovo Lake, a lake in North Macedonia
 Mavrovo and Rostuša Municipality, a municipality in North Macedonia
 Mavrovo, Mavrovo and Rostuša, a village in North Macedonia
 Mavrochori, also called Mavrovo, a village in Greece, near Kastoria
 Mavrovë, a village in Vlorë County, Albania